A Fragile Hope is the debut full-length album by English metalcore band Devil Sold His Soul, released through Eyesofsound/Black Willow on 18 June 2007. Dave Robinson (of Fireapple Red) performs all drums and percussion on the album, and Matt Elphick performs guest vocals on "Awaiting the Flood" and "Coroner".

Track listing

Personnel

Devil Sold His Soul
 Ed Gibbs – vocals 
 Jonny Renshaw – guitar 
 Richard Chapple – guitar 
 Ian Trotter – bass guitar 
 Paul Kitney – samples 
 Dave Robinson – drums

Additional musicians
 Matt Elphick – guest vocals on "Awaiting the Flood" and "Coroner"

Production
 Produced by Jonny Renshaw and Devil Sold His Soul
 Engineered and mixed by Jonny Renshaw
 Mastered by John Dent

References

2007 debut albums
Devil Sold His Soul albums